Ronnie Huckeba is a retired American football coach. He was the head coach at Harding University in Searcy, Arkansas from 2007 to 2016.  He compiled a record of 69–40, winning a Great American Conference championship and reaching the quarterfinals of the NCAA Division II Football Championship playoffs in his final season.

Huckeba was an offensive lineman for Harding from 1973 to 1976, starting at offensive guard on the Bisons' 1976 Arkansas Intercollegiate Conference co-championship squad. He coached high school football in Arkansas, Texas and Louisiana before coming back to Harding as an assistant coach for John Prock.

One of his sons, Jeb Huckeba, played defensive end for the Arkansas Razorbacks and later played for two seasons with the Seattle Seahawks.

Following his retirement from coaching in 2016, Huckeba took on his current role as the senior advancement officer at Harding.

Head coaching record

College

Notes

References

Year of birth missing (living people)
Living people
American football offensive linemen
Harding Bisons football coaches
Harding Bisons football players
High school football coaches in Arkansas
High school football coaches in Louisiana
High school football coaches in Texas